Niebrzydowo may refer to the following places in Poland:

Niebrzydowo Małe
Niebrzydowo Wielkie